Nitithorn Thippong (born 15 October 1996) is a Thai professional golfer who plays on the Asian Tour.

Professional career
Thippong turned professional in 2015.

In 2018, Thippong got his first win on the Asian Development Tour at the PGM Penang Championship in Penang, Malaysia. He finished the season second in the Order of Merit to gain a place on the Asian Tour for 2019.

In 2022, Thippong won his first Asian Tour title at the DGC Open in New Delhi, India. He beat Ajeetesh Sandhu in a playoff. Later in August 2022, Thippong won his second Asian Tour event at the International Series Singapore.

Professional wins (5)

Asian Tour wins (2)

1Co-sanctioned by the Professional Golf Tour of India

Asian Tour playoff record (1–0)

Asian Development Tour wins (1)

1Co-sanctioned by the Professional Golf of Malaysia Tour

All Thailand Golf Tour wins (1)

Thailand PGA Tour wins (1)

References

External links

Nitithorn Thippong
Asian Tour golfers
Nitithorn Thippong
1996 births
Living people
Nitithorn Thippong